Elections in the Republic of India in 1983 included elections to six state legislative assemblies and to seats in the Rajya Sabha.

Legislative Assembly elections

Andhra Pradesh

Assam

Delhi

|- align=center
!style="background-color:#E9E9E9" class="unsortable"|
!style="background-color:#E9E9E9" align=center|Political Party
!style="background-color:#E9E9E9" |No. of candidates
!style="background-color:#E9E9E9" |No. of elected
!style="background-color:#E9E9E9" |Number of Votes
!style="background-color:#E9E9E9" |% of Votes
|-
| 
|align="left"|Indian National Congress||56||34||856,055||47.50%
|-
| 
|align="left"|Bharatiya Janata Party||50||19||666,605||36.99%
|-
| 
|align="left"|Lok Dal||6||2||73,765||4.09%
|-
| 
|align="left"|Janata Party||37||1||65,980||3.66%
|-
|
! Total !! 400 !! 56 !! 1,802,118 !!
|-
|}

Jammu and Kashmir

Karnataka

|- align=center
!style="background-color:#E9E9E9" class="unsortable"|
!style="background-color:#E9E9E9" align=center|Political Party
!style="background-color:#E9E9E9" |Seats Contested
!style="background-color:#E9E9E9" |Seats Won
!style="background-color:#E9E9E9" |Number of Votes
!style="background-color:#E9E9E9" |% of Votes
!style="background-color:#E9E9E9" |Seat change
|-
| 
|align="left"|Janata Party||193||95||4,272,318||33.07%|| 36
|-
| 
|align="left"|Indian National Congress||221||82||5,221,419||40.42%|| 67
|-
| 
|align="left"|Bharatiya Janata Party||110||18||1,024,892||7.93%|| 18
|-
| 
|align="left"|Communist Party of India||7||3||161,192||1.25%||
|-
| 
|align="left"|Communist Party of India (Marxist)||4||3||115,320||0.89%|| 3
|-
| 
|align="left"|All India Anna Dravida Munnetra Kazhagam||1||1||16,234||0.13%|| 1
|-
| 
|align="left"|Independents||751||22||1,998,256||15.47%|| 12
|-
|
|align="left"|Total||1365||224||12,919,459||||
|-
|}

Meghalaya

In the 1978 election, two candidates from the PDIC were elected, but the party had not obtained registration in time for the election; at that time, the party's representatives were recorded as independents in the official results.

Does not include the two PDIC candidates elected as independents in 1978.

Tripura

Rajya Sabha

References

External links
 

1983 elections in India
India
1983 in India
Elections in India by year